Bacheh (also Romanized as Bācheh; also known as Bārcheh) is a village in Baraan-e Shomali Rural District, in the Central District of Isfahan County, Isfahan Province, Iran. At the 2006 census, its population was 477, in 128 families.

References 

Populated places in Isfahan County